Nematobrycon lacortei is a species of fish in genus Nematobrycon. The species is also known as Rainbow Tetra is a freshwater characiformes notable for its iridescent sheen from which its name is derived.

References 

Characidae
Endemic fauna of Colombia
Freshwater fish of Colombia
Fish described in 1971